A by-election was held for the New South Wales Legislative Assembly electorate of Tenterfield on 6 February 1882 because of the resignation of John Dillon, to accept an appointment as senior stipendiary magistrate.

Dates

Candidates

 Edward Bennett was a barrister from Sydney, who had stood unsuccessfully for Glen Innes in 1880.

 Augustus Fraser was a local pastoralist. This was his only candidacy for the Legislative Assembly.

Result

John Dillon resigned.

See also
Electoral results for the district of Tenterfield
List of New South Wales state by-elections

References

1882 elections in Australia
New South Wales state by-elections
1880s in New South Wales